"Summer Sunshine" is a song by Irish band the Corrs, the opening track from their fourth studio album, Borrowed Heaven (2004). The song was released as the album's first single on 17 May 2004, reaching number 12 in the band's native Ireland and number six on the UK Singles Chart. In Hungary, "Summer Sunshine" peaked at number one for two weeks. Elsewhere, the song reached number two in Spain and peaked within the top 20 in Australia, Italy, and the Netherlands. The music video was directed by Kevin Godley.

Composition
According to lead vocalist Andrea Corr, "Summer Sunshine" is a joyful-sounding song with melancholy lyrics. She explained that the song is about a "secret love that you can never quite get over, a forbidden love that lives in your head". Set in common time, "Summer Sunshine" is composed in the key of F major with a tempo of 124 beats per minute.

Music video

Shot in London on 15 and 16 March 2004, the video portrays a couple inside a dark house, which the Corrs are tearing down. The house is eventually reduced to ruins but the couple emerge from it, safe and in the sunshine.

Track listings

UK CD1
 "Summer Sunshine" – 2:53
 "Summer Sunshine" (Fernando Garibay Remix) – 3:06

UK CD2
 "Summer Sunshine" (single version)
 "Summer Sunshine" (acoustic)
 "Summer Sunshine" (Ford Remix edit)
 "Summer Sunshine" (video)
 "Silver Strand" (live acoustic)
 Behind the scenes at the video

European CD single
 "Summer Sunshine"
 "Summer Sunshine" (acoustic version)

Australian CD single
 "Summer Sunshine"
 "Summer Sunshine" (acoustic version)
 "Summer Sunshine" (Fernando Garibay Remix)

Credits and personnel
Credits are lifted from the European CD single liner notes.

Studios
 Mixed at MacMan Digital (Los Angeles, California, US)
 Mastered at Marcussen Mastering (Los Angeles, California, US)
 Acoustic version recorded and mixed at Sanctuary Westside Studios (London, UK)

The Corrs
 The Corrs – writing
 Andrea Corr – lead vocals, backing vocals, tin whistle
 Sharon Corr – violin, backing vocals
 Jim Corr – acoustic and electric guitars, piano, keyboards
 Caroline Corr – drums, percussion, backing vocals, bodhrán

Additional musicians
 Jim McGorman – piano
 Max Surla – orchestral arrangement and performance

Others
 Olle Romo – production, programming, mixing
 Tim Martin – recording
 Steve MacMillan – recording, mixing
 Stephen Marcussen – mastering
 Craig Kallman – A&R
 John Hughes – management
 Stylorouge – artwork design and direction
 Kevin Westenberg – photography

Charts

Weekly charts

Year-end charts

Release history

References

2004 singles
2004 songs
Atlantic Records singles
The Corrs songs
Music videos directed by Kevin Godley
Number-one singles in Hungary
Songs written by Andrea Corr
Songs written by Caroline Corr
Songs written by Jim Corr
Songs written by Sharon Corr